

Station List

R